Valdegrudas es un municipio localizado en la provincia de Guadalajara, Castilla-La Mancha, España. Con 67 habitantes censados en Enero de 2012, de los cuales 46 son varones y 21 son mujeres, según el Instituto Nacional de Estadística <INE></http://www.ine.es/>.
Alcalde desde 2007 es Carlos Amalio Viejo Coracho.

http://www.ine.es/

Municipalities in the Province of Guadalajara